Willi Welt (born 19 August 1926) was an Austrian gymnast. He competed at the 1948 Summer Olympics and the 1952 Summer Olympics.

References

External links
 

1926 births
Possibly living people
Austrian male artistic gymnasts
Olympic gymnasts of Austria
Gymnasts at the 1948 Summer Olympics
Gymnasts at the 1952 Summer Olympics
Place of birth missing
20th-century Austrian people